Taylor C. McLendon (born 1995), known professionally as Ivy Sole, is an American rapper and record producer from Philadelphia, PA. Ivy Sole has been a member of Indigold, Liberal Art, and Third Eye Optiks. Ivy Sole has been mentioned as an example of the growing movement of non-binary artists.

Early life 
McLendon grew up queer in a Southern Baptist Church and received all of their vocal training in a church setting. McLendon was raised in a predominantly black neighborhood, but attended a predominantly white magnet school.

A week after their 18th birthday, McLendon attended a Mac Miller concert featuring Rapsody and Nicki Minaj, which they cite as their inspiration for pursuing a musical career.

Career 
Ivy Sole began their musical career by joining three different collaborations called Indigold, Liberal Art, and Third Eye Optiks.

In 2016, Ivy Sole began their solo career with the debut mixtape entitled Eden, which would be followed by the extended plays West and then East. NPR noted that Ivy Sole tackles mental health issues in their music video for the track entitled "Life" off of the extended play East.

In 2018, Ivy Sole released their debut full-length album entitled Overgrown. Pitchfork did a review of the track entitled "Achilles" off of the album Overgrown.

In 2020, a live recording of Overgrown entitled Overgrown* (Live from Philadelphia) was released.

Personal life 
McLendon moved to Philadelphia in 2011 to attend the Wharton School of the University of Pennsylvania. They graduated with the Class of 2015 with a degree in business.

Describing their sexual orientation to Billboard, McLendon stated: "I like women and I like men. I like women a lot though. Women have me on my ass, which is rare -- I feel like I’m a very calm and collected person.” McLendon is non-binary, and uses they/them pronouns.

Discography

Studio albums 

 Eden (2016)
 Overgrown (2018)
 Candid (2022)

Live albums 

 Overgrown* (Live from Philadelphia) (2020)

Extended plays 

 West (2017)
 East (2017)
 SOUTHPAW (2020)

Singles 

 "Backwoods" (2018)
 "Rollercoaster" (2018)
 "Life (feat. Dave B)" (2016)

Guest appearances 

 Cro- "fake you." from tru (2017)
Franky Hill – "Lies" from User (2018)
 B4bonah – "4 U" from B4Beginning (2019)
 Hadji Gaviota – "tHAt SiNkiNg feeliNg..." from ANCHORS (2019)
 Myles Cream – "Peace" from Grillo (2019)
 Charles Fauna – "Listen" from Yonder (2020)
 Birthh – "Ultraviolet" from WHOA (2020)
 Blossom – "Sass (sowle Remix)" from Sass (sowle Remix) (2020)
 Pool Cosby – "Day Breaks" from Day Breaks (2020)
 Shura – "elevator girl" from elevator girl (2020)

Concert tours 

The Femmetape Summer Tour

References

External links 
 Official Website
 Ivy Sole website at Bandcamp
 Ivy Sole discography at Discogs

1995 births
Living people
Non-binary musicians
21st-century American rappers
American neo soul singers
Rappers from Philadelphia